Ho Baron is a surrealist sculptor living and working in El Paso, Texas. His controversial pieces have been featured in shows, galleries, museums and public art installations in Arizona, California, Colorado, Illinois, Maryland, Nevada, New Hampshire, New Mexico, New York, Ohio, Oklahoma, Texas, Virginia, Washington and Mexico.

Baron creates anthropomorphic creatures from bronze and cast stone. He calls these whimsical fantastic icons "Gods for Future Religions."

Biography
Born in Chicago in 1941 and raised in El Paso on the Mexican border, Baron earned a BA and MA in English, writing his Master's thesis on Joyce Cary's concept of the "artist as child," a guiding theme he still abides by.  While serving in the Peace Corps in Nigeria and Ethiopia, he became intrigued with primitive, intuitive African art. Baron later lived in New York City, Philadelphia, Austin, and the Virgin Islands. In 1970, he settled in Antwerp, Belgium, working as the photographer for the art collective Ercola (Experimental Research Center of Liberal Arts) which published the underground comic Spruit.

In the late 1970s, Baron returned to the United States and studied sculpture, first at the Philadelphia College of Art and later at the University of Texas, El Paso, though he is largely self-taught and his expression is intuitive. He earned a second Master's degree in library science, and after a stint in retail, he worked part-time as a college librarian allowing him free time for his creative endeavors. A long-time proponent of the arts, he served on the City of El Paso Public Art Committee 2006-2007 and on the board of the Texas Society of Sculptors 2011–2015.

Baron as a young man was a writer. His passion to live creatively took him to the visual arts: photography, pen and ink drawing, painting and finally sculpture.  He occasionally published a satirical political newspaper, The El Paso Lampoon.  Baron has had photo exhibits and published a book of photos entitled El Paso: A Hoverview: 59 works.  He was a radio disc jockey of a new music radio program for seven years on N.P.R.  In 2007, he began creating short videos of his sculpture.  He published his second book, Gods for Future Religions: Surreal Sculpture, in 2012.

Baron began sculpting in 1979 and eventually created more than 300 narrative bronze and cast stone figures.  In his elder years, he turned to creating scores of sculptural assemblages.  Baron's theme is of the human form, abstracting it with unique motifs of surreal imagery.  Jesse Walker once wrote that his sculptures seem to have "emerged from both the deepest levels of the ocean and the deepest levels of the subconscious."  Regarding the title for his collective work, Baron satirizes: "When society's tired of its existing gods, it's going to need new ones, and I'm ready."

Selected works
Baron's surrealistic bronze, "The Free Thinker," is on permanent display at Baltimore's American Visionary Art Museum.  Baron also has pieces in the permanent collections of the Albuquerque Museum of Art and History, the El Paso Museum of Art, the El Paso Museum of Archaeology, the Las Cruces Museum of Art, the Roswell Museum and Art Center, Silver City, New Mexico and permanent public art sculptures at the El Paso Public Library, Georgetown, Texas, and Round Rock, Texas.

Notes

References

 Baron, Ho. El Paso: A Hoverview: 59 Works. El Paso, TX: Eastward Ho Productions, 1981. Print.
 Baron, Ho. "The Free Thinker and a Novel Romance." The Third Dimension [Texas Society of Sculptors, Austin, TX] May–June 2005. Web. 30 April 2009.
 Baron, Richard. "Profile: Ho Baron." Newspaper Tree 14 Nov. 2004. Web. 30 April 2009.
 Callis, Doris Marks. "River Span Sculpture Exhibition, Sale VIP Reception." The Pulse of Our Town [Cincinnati, OH] 25 June 2008: 18. Print.
 Cottingham, Steven. "The Artist behind Central El Paso's Art House." El Paso Herald Post 20 Jan. 2018. Web. 2 Nov. 2019.
 "Eight TSOS Members Featured in Marble Falls 'Sculpture on the Main.'" The Third Dimension [Texas Society of Sculptors, Austin, TX] Jan.- March 2008: 2. Print.
 "El Paso a la Swift." Pluma Fronteriza Winter/Spring 2004: 1. Print.
 Fabry, Judy. "The Georgetown Sculpture Tour." Georgetown Arts and Culture 24 Oct. 2010. N. pag. Web. 05 Feb. 2011.
 Hernández, Luis Pablo. "Invitan a entrar al mundo de las artes paseñas." El Diario de El Paso: 10 Abril 2017. Web. 13 Nov. 2017. 
 hobaron. YouTube 30 April 2009. Web. 30 April 2009.
 Lara, Stephania. "The Artistry of Ho Baron." The Prospector: 30 March 2010: N. pag. Web. 14 Aug. 2010.
 Ligon, Betty. "Edgy Artists, Musicians Push Boundaries for El Paso Viewers." El Paso Times 14-20 Nov. 2004: 3B. Print.
 Montoya, Isaiah. "The Creations of Ho Baron." Eastside Reporter [El Paso, TX] 10-16 Dec. 2004: 3-4. Print.
 Moore, S. Derrickson. "ART: Museum of Fine Art 'Pushes the Envelope' with Exhibits." Las Cruces Sun-News [Las Cruces, NM] 17 June 2005: 2C. Print.
 "Public Art: Round Rock Texas." Web. 26 Nov. 2020.
 Review of "Gods for Future Religions."  Raw Vision 78 (Spring 2013): 69. Print.
 Schuddeboom, Bas. "Jean-Claude Block." Lambiek Comiclopedia 14 Nov 2017. Web. 10 Dec 2017.
 Spencer, Keith Allyn. "Ho Baron Puts Works on Web." El Paso Times. 23 Jan. 2009. Print.
 "Strange Figurations." Direct Art 17 2010-2011: N. pag. Print.
 "Surreal Icons in Bronze." Desert Exposure [Silver City, NM] June 2005: A19. Print.
 Villalva, Maribel. "Baron Sculpture Greets Visitors to Main Library." El Paso Times 5 Nov. 2006: 3F. Print.
 ---. "El Paso's Loss Is New York's Gain." El Paso Times 2 May 2004: 3F. Print.
 Walker, Jesse. "Visions of Water: Outsider Art and H2O." Reasononline 5 Oct 2004. Web. 24 April 2009.
 "Ways to Use the Internet." The Third Dimension [Texas Society of Sculptors, Austin, TX] Jan.- March 2009: 7. Print.
 Webb, Julie, with Bruce Webb. "A Walk Across Texas Art Environments." The Nasher Magazine Summer 2021. Print.
 Zanetell, Myrna. "El Paso Artist's World Travels Inspired Unique Sculptures." El Paso Scene: Nov. 2019. Web. 2 Nov. 2019.

External links
 Gods for Future Religions Artist's Website
 El Paso Artist’s World Travels Inspired Unique Sculptures

American surrealist artists
University of Texas at El Paso alumni
University of the Arts (Philadelphia) alumni
American expatriates in Nigeria
American expatriates in Ethiopia
American expatriates in Belgium
Artists from Chicago
1941 births
Living people
Sculptors from Illinois